

The CAB GY-20 Minicab is a two-seat light aircraft designed by Yves Gardan and built in France by Construction Aeronautiques du Bearn (CAB) in the years immediately following World War II. CAB was formed in 1948 by Yves Gardan, Max Lapoerte and M. Dubouts.

Design and development
The Minicab is a conventional, low-wing cantilever monoplane with fixed tailwheel undercarriage, powered by a Continental A65 engine.  Its design was a scaled-down version of the aircraft that Yves Gardan had designed for SIPA, the SIPA S.90. The pilot and passenger sit side by side and access to the cockpit is via a one-piece perspex canopy that hinges forwards. Gardan's intention was to produce a low-cost, easy-to-fly, easy-to-maintain aircraft with the possibility of homebuilding.

Production

The prototype Minicab first flew at Pau-Idron on 1 February 1949 with Max Fischl at the controls. CAB manufactured a total of about 65 Minicabs when production ended in 1955. The rights for the plans were then acquired by Arthur Ord-Hume in the United Kingdom who anglicised the drawings and made various minor improvements for home-builders.  A large number were completed by amateur builders in the United Kingdom, France and other countries around the world. There is about 20 Minicabs currently active in the United Kingdom, many of which were built (or rebuilt) to the JB.01 standard, developed by M. Jean Barritault, usually with a Continental C90 engine.

Falconar sold plans for a tricycle gear homebuilt model named the Minihawk. Another development is the K&S or Squarecraft Cavalier which is a redesigned Minicab in several versions with plans translated from French to English and modified by Stan Mcleod. The plans were marketed by K&S Aircraft of Calgary, Alberta and later MacFam.

Operational history
 
Type certification was obtained in mid-April 1949. By the end of 1950, a Minicab had won the Coupe de Vitesse de Deauville (Deauville Cup for speed), and the Grand Prix Aérien de Vichy (Vichy Aerial Prize). The following year, a Minicab broke the world air distance record for its class (1,825 km, 1,138 miles) and in 1952 it attained  the world airspeed record for its class over a 2,000 km circuit, with an average speed of (183 km/h, 114 mph).

One Minicab, G-AWEP, was flown by the ex-RAF fighter pilot Roland Beamont who was a test pilot at BAC Samlesbury. He made its first flight in 1969 and wrote that "the Minicab felt light and very responsive... landing required the delicate touch of a Spitfire pilot. In fact the overall control harmony is not dissimilar to that classic aeroplane".

Variants
GY-20 MinicabCAB first production model.
GY-201 Minicabrefined version with increased fuel capacity, reduced wingspan, strengthened undercarriage, split flaps, and castoring tailwheel. CAB final production model and also principal homebuilt version.
Barritault JB.01 Minicabbuilt to the modified design of Jean Barritault.
Falconar HawkMinicabs built to plans supplied by Falconar
Falconar MiniHawkplans-built design from Falconar with tricycle undercarriage.
MacFam Cavalier (K&S or Squarecraft Cavalier)Redesigned in several versions principally with tricycle and swept tail surfaces, and strengthened for a more powerful engine.

Specifications (GY-20)

See also

References

Notes

Bibliography

 
 
 
 
 
 
 AviaFrance CAB GY-20 Minicab
 Canal Blog "Le Minicab"
 Oldtimer-Homepage der Segel- und Motorfluggruppe Veterano, Birrfeld
 Musée Régional de l'Air d'Angers-Marcé
 The Rochester GYAT Flying Group

1940s French civil utility aircraft
Homebuilt aircraft
Minicab
Low-wing aircraft
Single-engined tractor aircraft
Aircraft first flown in 1949